The Umar tree frog (Litoria umarensis) is a species of frog in the subfamily Pelodryadinae.

It is endemic to West Papua, Indonesia. Its natural habitats are subtropical or tropical moist lowland forests, subtropical or tropical swamps, shrub-dominated wetlands, swamps, and heavily degraded former forests.

References

Litoria
Amphibians of Western New Guinea
Amphibians described in 2004
Taxonomy articles created by Polbot